Lucchini Engineering is an Italian sports car constructor and racing team.  Founded by Giorgio Lucchini in Porto Mantovano in 1980, the company has built a wide variety of open-cockpit prototypes for use in hillclimbs as well as Le Mans Prototypes for endurance racing.  Besides racing their own cars, their chassis have been sold to various privateer teams over the years.

Lucchini has had some success over the years, including winning the FIA Sportscar Championship's team and constructor championships in the SR2-class two years in a row (2002 and 2003).  They have also won various European, Italian, and French hillclimb championships.

Currently Lucchini sells the CN4 hillclimb car and the LMP2/08 LMP2-class prototype which runs in the Le Mans Series.

History
The motorsport company was founded by Giorgio Lucchini in Porto Mantovano in 1980 and manufactures a large number of open sports car prototypes for use in hill climbs in the CN group and in the Le Mans prototype series for long-distance races. The various vehicles were powered by Alfa Romeo, BMW, Ford, Opel, Judd and Nissan engines.

Lucchini has had a number of successes over the years, including winning the FIA Sportscar Championship Team and Constructors Championship in the SR2 class in 2002 and 2003. Lucchini's cars have also won various European hillclimb championships, such as Switzerland's Philippe Darbellay taking part in 1991 a Lucchini S289. In 2006 Filippo Francioni won the Italian prototype championships with a Lucchini Alfa Romeo 12V. Giampiero Consonni drove Lucchini sports prototypes at the Italian Championships in the 1990s and also won a few races.

From 2008 onwards, LMP2 prototypes were made with Judd engines, which were used in the Le Mans Series. Drivers were the Italian pilots Marco Didaio, Filippo Francioni and Mirco Savoldi.

Although there are still numerous Lucchini racing cars around the world, the whereabouts of the sports car manufacturer is unclear, production was probably stopped in 2009. Numerous Lucchini vehicles can still be found at historic motorsport races. A well-known vehicle from 1986 (series SN86) is owned by German racing driver Helmut Bross.

Models produced
List:
SN86-33, Alfa Romeo 2.5, 1986
SP288-050, BMW, 1988
S289/055, Alfa Romeo, 1989
SP390/072, custom made, 1990
SP390/073, Alfa Romeo 3.0 24V, 1990
SP90/077, Alfa Romeo, 1990
SP91/084, Alfa Romeo 3.0 12V, 1991
SP91/085, custom made, 1991
P3-94/102, Alfa Romeo 3.0 24V, 1994
P3-94/105, BMW, 1994
P3-95/111, BMW, 1995
P3-95/115, Alfa Romeo, 1995
P3-96/116, Alfa Romeo, 1996
P3-96/124, BMW, 1996
P1-97/130, BMW, 1997
P1-98/132, BMW, 1998
P1-98/133, Alfa Romeo, 1998
P1-98/136, BMW, 1998
SR1-98/138, Ford, 1999
SR2-99/139, Alfa Romeo 3.0 12V, 1999
SR2-99/140, Alfa Romeo, 1999
SR2000/141, Alfa Romeo, 2000
SR2000/142, Alfa Romeo, 2000
SR2001/143, Alfa Romeo, 2001
SR2001/144, Alfa Romeo, 2001
SR2001/145, Alfa Romeo, 2001
SR2001/146, Alfa Romeo, 2001
SR2002/147, Alfa Romeo, 2002
SR2002/148, Nissan, 2002
LMP2-04/152, Judd, 2004
LMP2-04/157, according to customer requirements, 2006
LMP2-04/158, according to customer requirements, 2006
LMP2-08/165, Judd, 2008
LMP2-08/166, Judd, 2008

References

External links
 Lucchini Engineering

Car manufacturers of Italy
Italian auto racing teams
European Le Mans Series teams
FIA Sportscar Championship entrants
Italian racecar constructors